The common smoky honeyeater (Melipotes fumigatus) is a species of bird in the honeyeater family Meliphagidae. It is one of four species in the genus Melipotes, all closely related and forming a superspecies. After another similar species, the wattled smoky honeyeater, was discovered in 2005 in the Foja Mountains, it has also been called the common smoky honeyeater.

The species is endemic to the island of New Guinea, where it occurs in the Central Ranges across the length of the island, as well as two isolated populations in the northwest and north of the island. There are three subspecies: the nominate race occurs in the eastern Herzog Mountains and southeast New Guinea; M. f. kumawa is restricted to the southern Bomberai Peninsula; and M. f. goliathi ranges from the Weyland Mountains to the western Herzog Mountains.

See also
List of birds of Papua New Guinea

References

Melipotes
Birds of New Guinea
Birds described in 1886
Taxonomy articles created by Polbot